Luisa Lebrón Burgos (born May 17, 1949 in Patillas, Puerto Rico) is a Puerto Rican judge, politician, and former senator. She was a member of the Senate of Puerto Rico from 1993 to 2000.

Biography

Luisa Lebrón Burgos was born May 17, 1949 in Patillas, Puerto Rico. She received her bachelor's degree from the University of Puerto Rico. In 1974, she received her Juris doctor from the University of Puerto Rico School of Law.

Lebrón worked as a legal aide for the Housing Department of Puerto Rico, and the Corporation of Urban and Housing Renewal. She was also president of the Attorney Delegation of Carolina. She also established her own law firm.

In 1992, Lebrón was elected to the Senate of Puerto Rico representing the District of Carolina. In 1995, she was appointed as President pro tempore of the Senate of Puerto Rico, becoming the first woman to occupy that position. Lebrón was reelected in 1996.

Lebrón ran again in the 2000 elections, but lost to the candidates of the Popular Democratic Party. She served as a judge in the Carolina region.

See also

Senate of Puerto Rico

References

External links
Biografía Luisa Lebrón on SenadoPR

1949 births
Living people
Members of the Senate of Puerto Rico
People from Patillas, Puerto Rico
Presidents pro tempore of the Senate of Puerto Rico
University of Puerto Rico alumni